John Haughm (born September 14, 1975) is an American musician and artist. He is most known for being the founder, guitarist, and vocalist of the band Agalloch, and later Pillorian. He is also a designer who has created packaging and merchandise for several record labels and bands, including every project in which he has performed. From 2008 to 2018 he was the co-owner, creative director, and curator of the Dämmerung Arthouse.

Early life
John Haughm was born in Ellensburg, Washington, and grew up in Butte, Montana, where he played in several metal bands as a teenager, some of which were with future Agalloch bassist Jason William Walton.

Career

Agalloch and Sculptured (1996 – 2016)
Haughm and Walton moved to Portland where they met Don Anderson, guitarist of Sculptured, and found that they had "tremendously similar taste in music and cinema". Haughm founded Agalloch in January 1996, and had a brief stint in Sculptured, performing as the drummer on Apollo Ends.

Pillorian (2016 – 2019)
After Agalloch split in 2016, Haughm formed Pillorian with Stephen Parker and Trevor Matthews. This band was much more aggressive musically and more active as a touring act than Agalloch. They released Obsidian Arc in March 2017 and performed 100 shows in support of the album, including two American and two European tours between spring 2017 and summer 2018.

Controversy
In February 2019, Haughm was criticized by his most recent former Agalloch bandmates, all three of whom are presently in the band Khôrada, for posting a comment on Facebook that was perceived as anti-Semitic while paying tribute to the late Swiss actor Bruno Ganz. Both Parker and Matthews left Pillorian, leaving Haughm as the band's only remaining member.

In his apology letter, Haughm stated that his own comment was "insensitive, juvenile, reprehensible, and thoughtless to say the least." Haughm also signaled that Pillorian, despite having a 2nd album completely written and ready to record, was retired as a band. In January 2020, an interview with Don Anderson indicated that he and John had mended their friendship and that Haughm regretted making the comment.

Post-Pillorian (2019 – present)
Currently, Haughm is focused on solo and collaborative projects outside of the heavy metal genre.

Discography

With Agalloch
From Which of This Oak (demo 1997, 12-inch pic disc 2009)
Promo 1998 (demo 1998)
Pale Folklore (CD, 2×LP, ltd woodsleeve 2×LP 1999)
Of Stone, Wind and Pillor (MCD 2001, LP 2015, CD/LP 2021)
The Mantle (CD, cassette, 2×LP 2002)
Tomorrow Will Never Come (7-inch EP 2003)
The Grey (MCD 2004, MCD/MLP 2019)
Agalloch / Nest (10-inch pic disc, split EP 2004)
Ashes Against the Grain (CD, 2×LP, ltd woodbox CD 2006)
The White (MCD 2008, CD 2019, LP 2019)
The Demonstration Archive (compilation CD 2008, 3×LP boxset 2012)
The Silence of Forgotten Landscapes (live DVD 2009)
The Compendium Archive (compilation 2×CD 2010)
Marrow of the Spirit (CD, cassette, 2×LP, 2xpic disc, ltd CD+7" boxset 2010)
Whitedivisiongrey (compilation 2×CD digibook, 2×LP 2011)
Faustian Echoes (MCD, etched 12-inch LP 2012)
The Serpent & The Sphere (CD, cassette, etched 2×LP 2014)
Alpha Serpentis (Unukalhai) (7-inch single 2014, art edition 7-inch 2015)
V/A Satanic Lust (cassette 1997)
V/A White: Nightmares in The End (CD 1999)
V/A Sol Lucet Omnibus - Tribute to Sol Invictus (3CD 2002)
V/A At the End of Infinity (CD 2002)
V/A Nachtzauber (CD 2003)
V/A Phases - The Dark Side of Music (CD 2004)
V/A Alternate Endings (CD 2006)
V/A The Dark Psyche (CD 2006)
V/A Fall Into Darkness Festival (DVD 2009)
V/A Oak Folk (CD 2010)
V/A Der Wanderer Uber Dem Nebelmeer - Tribute to Caspar David Friedrich (2CD 2011)
V/A Autumn Fires/Fragmented Rays (CD 2021)

With Sculptured
Apollo Ends (CD 2000)
Suspiria (single 2000)

With Pillorian
A Stygian Pyre (7-inch single 2017)
Obsidian Arc (CD, cassette, LP 2017)

With Art of the Black Blood
Deficit Omne Quod Nasciture (demo 2007)
The Woodcut Demonstration (LP 2014)

With BEAST
Gnasher (album 2015)
Prey (album 2015)
Ravenous (album 2015)
Live At The Doug Fir Lounge, Feb 28th, 2015 (live album 2015)

With Allerseelen
Terra Incognita (CD 2015)
Venezia (LP bonus track 2018)
Frühgeschichte I. Schwartzer Rab (cassette bonus tracks 2019)

With Nest
Trail of the Unwary (guest vocals, CD 2007)
Within A Decade (guest vocals, 3CD 2014)

With Nothing
Nondescript: Ouroborus Vermiform (guest vocals, CD 1999)

With Nostalgia
Echoes from the Borderland (guitar, CD 2010)

With Obsidian Tongue
A Nest of Ravens in the Throat of Time (lead vocals on track 6, CD 2013)

With Andy Winter
Incomprehensible (lead vocals on track 2, CD 2013)

Solo
+46° 17' 36.30", -124° 4' 20.13" (7-inch EP, 2011)
122012 & 042911 (cassette 2012)
+37.717364 // -117.247955: The Last Place I Remember (cassette 2015, CD 2016)
1865 // 1895: CAST.IRON.BLOOD. (CD 2020)
The Scars Maketh The Man (music video 2021)
Whiskey & Rust (cassette 2022)

Collaborations
Mathias Grassow & John Haughm - Mosaic (CD 2012, LP 2015)
Daniel Menche & John Haughm - Orthrus (CD+7", 2012)
Mathias Grassow & John Haughm - Auræ (CD 2015)
Mathias Grassow & John Haughm - Opalus (CD 2020)

Film scores
OUTCALL:Initiation (film score 2021)

References

External links
Agalloch official site

1975 births
Living people
American rock musicians
American heavy metal musicians
Singers from Oregon
Musicians from Missoula, Montana
21st-century American singers
21st-century American male singers